Wallace Clark (14 July 1896 – 20 December 1975) was an English professional footballer who played as an outside forward. He scored two goals in 80 appearances in the Football League playing for Middlesbrough, Leeds United, Birmingham, Coventry City, Barrow and Torquay United.

Clark was born in Jarrow, County Durham, and began his football career with Durham City before joining Middlesbrough when the Football League resumed after the First World War. Two seasons later he was transferred to Leeds United for a fee of £460, and in March 1923 moved on to Birmingham. He played regularly until he suffered an injury towards the end of the 1923–24 season, and did not play for the first team again, moving on to Coventry City in October 1924. After that he spent no more than a year with any club, playing for Boston Town in the Midland League, returning to the Football League with Barrow and Torquay United, then the Cheshire County League with Connah's Quay & Shotton. He went on to play bowls, and became vice-president of Jarrow Bowling Club.

He died in his native Jarrow aged 79.

References

1896 births
1975 deaths
Sportspeople from Jarrow
Footballers from Tyne and Wear
English footballers
Association football wingers
Durham City A.F.C. players
Middlesbrough F.C. players
Leeds United F.C. players
Birmingham City F.C. players
Coventry City F.C. players
Boston Town F.C. (1920s) players
Barrow A.F.C. players
Torquay United F.C. players
Connah's Quay & Shotton F.C. players
English Football League players